Richard Naidu is a Fijian lawyer of Indian descent.  A partner with the Munro Leys law firm, he was an unsuccessful candidate for the Presidency of the Fiji Law Society on 9 September 2006.

Naidu and the 2006 coup d'état

Naidu strongly criticized the Republic of Fiji Military Forces, which seized power in the military coup of 5 December 2006.  The day before the coup, the Fiji Village news service quoted Naidu as condemning what he called a serious crime against the state. Reports on 18 and 22 December quoted him as strongly opposing suggestions that the Military might abrogate the Constitution, though he predicted that it would probably come to that as there was no other way to legitimize the coup.  "The military also seems determined to impose its will on the country by force so inevitably I think it will end up abrogating the Constitution and 'starting again'," he was quoted as saying.

The coup was not the beginning of Naidu's criticism of the Military.  Nine months previously, in the face of public rumors that President Ratu Josefa Iloilo had refused a government request to dismiss the Military Commander, Commodore Frank Bainimarama, Naidu had indicated that it was the President's constitutional duty to act on the advice of the government and could be dismissed if he refused.

On 26 December 2006, Naidu condemned the physical abuse allegedly meted out to six pro-democracy activists, who were summoned to Suva's Queen Elizabeth Barracks (QEB) at around midnight on Christmas morning.  Such abuse was unlawful and unacceptable, Naidu said.  He called on the Fiji Human Rights Commission to take a stand against such violations.

Naidu also spoke out against the Fiji Human Rights Commission for supporting the coup.  On 4 January 2007, he ridiculed a report written by the Commission's Director, Shaista Shameem, which endorsed many of the Military's stated reasons for its actions.  Describing the report as "mostly laughable", he said, "Somewhere in her academic career, Ms Shameem apparently picked up a law degree. Her latest effort illustrates the dangers of allowing academic sociology types to study serious subjects like law," adding, "I don't think any real lawyer will take it (the report) very seriously". Shameem dismissed Naidu's criticism, saying she believed he had a hidden agenda.

On 16 January, Naidu dismissed the announcement that the Military had restored Ratu Josefa Iloilo to the Presidency, saying that it did not legitimize the State of Emergency or the interim government.

Naidu's arrest
On 23 January, Naidu was arrested at a little after 9PM and taken to Queen Elizabeth Barracks for interrogation.

Earlier that day, Naidu, speaking on Radio New Zealand, had attacked President Ratu Josefa Iloilo as a puppet of the Military and the "illegal" interim government. "Let's face it, he's the military President now," he said. "We can pretend that just because he was the President before the coup and is the President after the coup, that we have some sort of constitutional government. But the fact is the President eventually simply submitted to the military. He's the military's President, he's not the Constitution's president." He was also quoted as accusing the interim government of making "illegal laws" ad hoc to circumvent court rulings it did not like.

The Secretary of the President's Office, Rupeni Nacewa, rejected Naidu's claims, saying that as the Fijian constitution remained intact, Iloilo was still the constitutional President.

Interim Attorney General Aiyaz Sayed-Khaiyum called Naidu's comments about the President, whom Khaiyum said had "a lot of wisdom", "an insult" and "disrespectful." He did recommend, however, that the Military lay charges against people it accused of incitement, rather than summarily detaining them. He said that he had gone to the barracks at around 11PM to secure Naidu's release. Major Neumi Leweni had told him that Naidu had breached the Public Order Act and the State of Emergency decree.

Human Rights Commissioner and Fiji Women's Crisis Centre coordinator Shamima Ali claimed to have negotiated with senior Military officers and Cabinet Minister Bernadette Ganilau and Attorney-General Khaiyum for Naidu's release, but the Military denied this.

At the barracks, Naidu was warned to stop making "inciteful" remarks. Major Neumi Leweni told him that freedom of speech does not include the freedom to be "untruthful."

The Military also announced that it was considering bringing charges against Naidu.

References

Year of birth missing (living people)
Living people
Fijian people of Indian descent
20th-century Fijian lawyers
People educated at Suva Grammar School
21st-century Fijian lawyers